Mo'ayyad Salim Mansour (born April 1, 1976 in Iraq) is an Iraqi-born retired Jordanian football forward of Palestinian origin.

Honors and participation in international tournaments

In AFC Asian Cups 
2004 Asian Cup

In Arab Nations Cup 
2002 Arab Nations Cup

In Pan Arab Games
1999 Pan Arab Games

In WAFF Championships 
2000 WAFF Championship  
2002 WAFF Championship 
2004 WAFF Championship

International goals

References
 Mo'ayyad Salim: "I Will Retire Football After the End of the 2011-2012 Season, But My Relationship With the Fans of Al-Faisaly Will Always Stay the Same"  
 Mo'ayyad Salim Officially Retires From Football

External links 
 
 

1976 births
Living people
Jordanian footballers
Jordan international footballers
Jordanian people of Palestinian descent
Association football forwards
Al-Faisaly SC players